

Canadian Football News in 1901
The ORFU stated that all players must sign amateur cards. The CRU ruled that the ball was to be placed on the ground in line with the front foot of the Scrimmage before the lines could come together. John Thrift Meldrum Burnside's revised football rules were put into play in the University of Toronto Inter-faculty games, and later in the Mulock Cup championship games.

Regular season

Final regular season standings
Note: GP = Games Played, W = Wins, L = Losses, T = Ties, PF = Points For, PA = Points Against, Pts = Points
*Bold text means that they have clinched the playoffs

League Champions

Playoffs

Dominion Championship

References

 
Canadian Football League seasons